Brandenbaumer Bach is a river of North Rhine-Westphalia, Germany. It is formed at the confluence of the Geseker Bach and the Störmeder Bach. It is a left tributary of the Lippe.

See also
List of rivers of North Rhine-Westphalia

References

Rivers of North Rhine-Westphalia
Rivers of Germany